Deutsche Wohnen SE is a German property company, and one of the 30 companies that compose the DAX index. The position in the DAX was reached in June 2020 from previous MDAX position after Lufthansa was downgraded to the MDAX because of losses during the COVID-19 pandemic.

In July 2015, it was reported that Deutsche Wohnen had about EUR 600M available, and might be looking to acquire 8,000-9,000 apartments.

In September 2021, a public referendum named after the company took place, asking the residents of Berlin if large corporate landlords should be expropriated of their residential apartments. Over 56% of voters agreed, and the decision has been put in front of the newly elected local government.

See also
Deutsche Wohnen & Co. enteignen
Gewobag

References

Companies listed on the Frankfurt Stock Exchange
Real estate companies of Germany
Companies based in Berlin